Megan Tandy (formerly Megan Heinicke; born 10 September 1988) is a Canadian biathlete.

Career
Tandy was raised in Prince George, British Columbia.

She competed at the 2010 Winter Olympics in Vancouver in the women's sprint (7.5 km), pursuit (10 km), mass start (12.5 km) and individual (15 km) competitions.

She placed 46th in the sprint on 13 February 2010 with a time of 22:07.7 and no penalties resulting in a +2:12.1 deficit.  In the pursuit on 16 February, she placed 36th with a time of 34:02.2 with one penalty resulting in a +3:46.2 deficit.

Along with Canadian biathletes Zina Kocher, Sandra Keith, Rosanna Crawford, and Megan Imrie, she posed for the Bold Beautiful Biathlon calendar to raise money to cover annual expenses for training and competition.

In January 2014 she was named to the 2014 Winter Olympic team.

Personal life
Megan Tandy married coach Ilmar Heinicke weeks after the 2010 Olympics and took her husband's surname. Her son, Predo, was born in November 2010. Tandy and Heinicke separated in September 2014.

2018 Winter Olympics
In January 2018, Tandy was named to Canada's 2018 Olympic team.

References

External links
 
 Megan Tandy at CTV Olympics
 
 
 

1988 births
Biathletes at the 2010 Winter Olympics
Biathletes at the 2014 Winter Olympics
Biathletes at the 2018 Winter Olympics
Canadian female biathletes
Living people
Olympic biathletes of Canada
Sportspeople from Prince George, British Columbia
Sportspeople from Victoria, British Columbia